Cho Soong-jae (born 20 December 1990) is a South Korean tennis player.

Cho has a career high ATP singles ranking of 488 achieved on 10 May 2010 and a career high ATP doubles ranking of 536, achieved on 16 May 2011. Cho has won two ITF singles titles and two ITF doubles titles.

Cho has represented South Korea at the Davis Cup, where he has a win–loss record of 2–0.

References

External links

1990 births
Living people
South Korean male tennis players
Tennis players from Seoul
Tennis players at the 2010 Asian Games
Medalists at the 2010 Asian Games
Asian Games bronze medalists for South Korea
Asian Games medalists in tennis
21st-century South Korean people